Indiana County–Jimmy Stewart Airport  (Indiana County Airport or Jimmy Stewart Field) is a county-owned public airport two miles (3 km) east of the borough of Indiana, in Indiana County, Pennsylvania. It is classified as a business service airport by the Pennsylvania Bureau of Aviation.

The airport was named after silver-screen legend Jimmy Stewart, who hails from Indiana, PA.

Facilities
The runway has medium intensity runway lighting (MIRL). The airport has three nonprecision approaches (LOC RWY 28, GPS 10, GPS 28).

In the year ending March 31, 2007 the airport had 26,100 aircraft operations, average 71 per day: 95% general aviation, 3% military and 2% air taxi. 45 aircraft are based at the airport: 89% single-engine, 9% multi-engine and 2% ultralight.

The Indiana County Airport Authority has received approval and funding for a new 5500 x 100 ft runway and will allow the installation of an instrument landing system (ILS). The old runway will become a parallel taxiway.

References

External links 
Indiana County–Jimmy Stewart Airport at the Pennsylvania Bureau of Aviation

Airports in Pennsylvania
County airports in Pennsylvania
Transportation buildings and structures in Indiana County, Pennsylvania